Gasan, officially the Municipality of Gasan, is a 3rd class municipality in the province of Marinduque, Philippines. According to the 2020 census, it has a population of 36,197 people.

The municipality is bounded by the provincial capital, Boac, to the north and east, by Buenavista to the southeast and by the Sibuyan Sea to the south and west. It is the second-oldest municipality in Marinduque, after Boac. Residents of Gasan are called Gaseños.

The Tres Reyes Islands off the coast of Marinduque are under the jurisdiction of Gasan, part of the municipality's Barangay Pinggan.

Etymology
The origin of the name of Gasan came from the term Gasang or Gasang-Gasang, a type of coral once abundant around the town's shoreline.  Legend has it that when the Spaniards discovered the town, they found an old woman near the banks of today's Matandang Gasan River.  When asked in Spanish what was the name of the town, she interpreted it as if they were asking about what was the name of the corals growing around the area, with the Spaniards interpreting her answer as the name of the town.  Over time, the term Gasang-Gasang was shortened to Gasang before being shortened further to Gasan.

History

In 1942, during World War II, the Japanese Imperial forces landed in Gasan, Marinduque.

In 1945, the combined United States and Allied Philippine Commonwealth forces landed in Gasan, Marinduque. The 5th Infantry Division of the Philippine Commonwealth Army was participated in the battle to attacking Japanese forces, during which hundreds of Japanese troops were taken prisoner at the town of Gasan, Marinduque.  This became known as the Battle of Marinduque.

In 1957, barrio Banto-anin was renamed as Bukal and barrio Hinubuan was renamed as Antipolo.

Geography

Barangays
Gasan is politically subdivided into 25 barangays.

All barangays in Gasan are bounded in part by coastline, except the mountainous barangays of Bachao Ilaya, Cabugao, Dawis, Mangiliol, Matandang Gasan, Tabionan, Tapuyan, and Tiguion, though Barangay Dawis is claiming that the coastline of Bukana, which is now controlled by Pinggan, belongs to them as well as the place itself.

Climate

Demographics

Religion 

 Catholic Church (Latin Rite)
 Philippine Independent Church
 Various Protestant groups

Economy

Transportation
The Marinduque Ring Road passes through Gasan and is known as San Jose Street in downtown Gasan.  Tricycles and jeepneys can be used to navigate the town, while jeepneys can also be used to go to other towns.  Taxis are available to and from major transportation terminals.  Buses also stop in downtown Gasan to go to Lucena City and further on to Metro Manila.  Many roads are paved.

Marinduque Airport, the island's only airport, is located in Barangay Masiga. Zest Air (now AirAsia Zest) was the first airline to resume scheduled flights to Marinduque in 2008 after its closure for four consecutive years.

Tourism

Gasan is home to some of Marinduque's best-known tourist spots:

 Guingona Park: This park located in Barangay Uno is where Gasan's cenaculos are played during the Moriones Festival.
 Reyes Park: Reyes Park in Barangay Dos serves as the Gasan boardwalk. This park is about to demolish as the present administration under Victoria Lao Lim pursue her intention of building a Commercial Sports Complex that according to her may generate funds for GASUAF.  Fairs are conducted in the park, and a wooden footbridge leading to nearby Barangay Dili can be seen (and crossed).  The bridge is a landmark of Barangay Dili.
 Talao Cave: Talao Cave in Barangay Tiguion is a series of twelve caves accessible from three mountain trails that can only be crossed on foot.  The caves are located in the midst of a rain forest.
 Tres Reyes Islands: The Tres Reyes Islands in Barangay Pinggan, named after the Three Kings of the Nativity, are a potential tourist destination.  True to its name, the island chain consists of three islands named Gaspar, Melchor and Baltazar and are visible from any point of the Gasan coastline.  Reaching the islands takes about 30–45 minutes by boat.

Barangay landmarks
In a recent tourist campaign known as "Parine na bayâ!", the municipal government promoted individual barangays' products and landmarks in a bid to showcase Gasan as a tourist destination.  Some include the following:

Culture

Festivals
There are three main festivals celebrated in Gasan, two of which are unique to the municipality:

 Araw ng Gasan: The Araw ng Gasan commemorates the town's founding nearly 400 years ago as a Spanish pueblo by Father Juan Rosado in honor of Saint Bernard of Marinduque.
 Gasang-Gasang Festival: The Gasang-Gasang Festival celebrates the origins of the name "Gasan".  Sponsored by the Gasan Culture and Arts Foundation (GASCUAF)with a certain contributions from 25 Barangays coming from their Barangay Budget, and held after the Moriones Festival, the festival features a live dance competition where several barangays have competed in the competition held in downtown Gasan.  In 2006, however, the festival was held instead at the open-air tiangge area of Barangay Libtangin due to objections from the mayor over the festival being held downtown.
 Moriones Festival: Like all other municipalities in Marinduque, Gasan celebrates the Moriones Festival during the Holy Week.  A parade of "morions", or Roman soldiers, is conducted in downtown Gasan, as well as the Gasan cenaculo at Guingona Park on Good Friday.

Education

Tertiary
Marinduque Midwest College
ESTI
St. Mary's College
Marinduque State University - College of Fisheries

Secondary
Bangbang National High School
Bognuyan National High School
Paciano A. Sena Memorial High School
Tapuyan National High School
Tiguion National High School
Marinduque Christian Academy
Marinduque Midwest College (High School Department)

Primary

References

External links

[ Philippine Standard Geographic Code]
Philippine Census Information
Local Governance Performance Management System 

Municipalities of Marinduque